Timbery is a surname. Notable people with the surname include:

Emma Timbery (1842–1916), Aboriginal Australian shellworker and matriarch
Esme Timbery (born 1931), Australia Bidjigal shellworker, great-granddaughter of Emma